ESTA or Esta may refer to:

 Esta (given name)
 Esta Brook, a pen name of American novelist and short story writer Lizzie P. Evans-Hansell 
 ESTA Holding, a Ukrainian real estate company
 Electronic System for Travel Authorization
 Emergency Services Telecommunications Authority, the emergency call-processing and service-dispatch agency for Victoria, Australia
 Entertainment Services and Technology Association
 ICAO code for Ängelholm–Helsingborg Airport, Sweden
 European String Teachers Association; see Bruno Giuranna

See also
 Esta Noche (disambiguation)